The Sweden cricket team toured Denmark to play a three-match Twenty20 International (T20I) series at the Svanholm Park in Brøndby. The series formed part of Denmark's preparation for the 2021 ICC Men's T20 World Cup Europe Qualifier, together with a tour of the Netherlands later in August to face Netherlands A. This series was the first international action with the Swedish national team for their coach, former South African international cricketer Jonty Rhodes. Denmark won the series 2–1. Sweden  followed the series with another in Finland.

Squads

T20I series

1st T20I

2nd T20I

3rd T20I

References

External links
 Series home at ESPNcricinfo

Associate international cricket competitions in 2021